Prasat Kuh Nokor is a Buddhist temple in the village of Trodoc Poung, Pong Ror commune, in Baray District, in Kampong Thom Province, Cambodia. It was built in 10th -11th century by the king Suryavarman I (1002-1050). It is part of the pagoda Wat Kuh Nokor.

It was built on a square shaped courtyard consisting of laterite and sandstone facing east. The throne is also square decorated by lotus flowers with several male statues. One of the statues is known to locals as the ‘Neak Ta Bark Kor’. 

The temple is known also for its two ponds temple. The largest is 160 metres long and 88 metres wide. The smaller of the two is 45 metres in length and 20 metres wide.

References

External links
Cambodia Tours

11th-century Buddhist temples
Buildings and structures in Kampong Thom province
Buddhist temples in Cambodia